Seta is a Torricelli language of Papua New Guinea.

References

One languages
Languages of Sandaun Province